Miss Teen International 2019, the 27th edition of the Miss Teen International pageant, was held on December 19, 2019, at the Kingdom of Dreams in Gurugram, India. Odalys Duarte of Mexico crowned her successor Aayushi Dholakia of India by the end of the event. This is India's first Miss Teen International title.

Result

Continental Queens of Beauty

Contestants

  - Anicia Gaothusi
  - Alessandra Santos
  - Sama Fouad
  - Tanya Pozzo
  - Aayushi Dholakia
  - Maria Luisa Piras
  - Soraya's Conde
  - Edera Shrestha
  - Yessenia Garcia
  - Francesca Beatriz Abalajon
  - Kayla Wright
  - Tania Rupasinghe
  - Phan Anh Thư

References

External links
 

2019 beauty pageants
Beauty pageants in India
2019 in India